Rietveld is a town in the Dutch province of South Holland. It is a part of the municipality of Molenlanden, and lies about 4 km northeast of Gorinchem.

The statistical area "Rietveld", which also can include the surrounding countryside, has a population of around 180.

References

Populated places in South Holland
Molenlanden